Live & off the Record (released as En Vivo y en Privado in Spain and Latin America) is the second live album by Colombian singer and songwriter Shakira. The album was released in 2004, and consists of a two-disc CD and DVD compilation. The CD includes recordings of live performances recorded during 2003 and 2004, and the DVD includes footage from Shakira's Tour of the Mongoose live performance in Rotterdam, Netherlands on 22 April 2003. The album was certified gold by the RIAA in May 2004. It peaked at the number one on the US Top Music Videos chart on 17 April 2004.

Track listing

CD

DVD

Personnel

Musicians
 Shakira – vocals, guitar, harmonica
 Tim Mitchell – guitar
 Rita Quintero – backing vocals, keyboards
 Adam Zimmon – guitar
 Albert Sterling Menendez – keyboards
 Pedro Alfonso – violin
 Dan Rothchild – bass guitar
 Brendan Buckley – drums
 Rafael Padilla – percussion

Production
 Shakira – production
 Tim Mitchell – production
 Dana Austin – production
 Bettina Abascal – post production
 Gonzalo Agulla – executive production
 José Arnal – executive production
 Dominic Morley – engineering
 Richard Robson – engineering
 Neil Tucker – engineering
 Matt Vaughan – engineering
 Richard Wilkinson – engineering
 Adrian Hall – mixing
 Chris Theis – mixing
 Mike Fisher – audio post-production
 Mike Wilder – mastering
 Ramiro Aguilar – video director
 Pablo Arraya – editing

Artwork
 Jeff Bender – photography
 Frank Ockenfels – photography
 Dan Rothchild – photography
 Ian Cuttler – art direction
 Frank Carbonari – graphic design
 Rose Noone – A&R

Certifications

Release history

References

Shakira live albums
2004 live albums
Live video albums
2004 video albums
Epic Records live albums
Epic Records video albums
Shakira video albums